Breizh Cola (from the Breton word for Brittany), is a brand of cola bottled by Phare Ouest and sold in Brittany, France. It is one of many new types of alternate cola, or "altercola," competing with more established and widespread brands such as Coca-Cola and Pepsi-Cola.

Lancelot Brewery launched Breizh Cola in 2002, after one of the owners, Bernard Lancelot, noticed colas from the United States in a home in the middle of the Guatemalan jungle during a trip in 1997. Altercolas like Breizh Cola appeal to consumers because they offer different and unique flavours, and are also popular with those concerned about preserving diversity of choice in beverages.

References

External links
  Official site 

Cola brands
Food and drink introduced in 2002